Gullapalli Nageswara Rao is an Indian ophthalmologist, the chairman of the Academia Ophthalmologica Internationalis (AOI) and the founder of the L. V. Prasad Eye Institute, Hyderabad. A former associate professor at the School of Medicine and Dentistry of the University of Rochester, Rao is a Fellow of the National Academy of Medical Sciences, India. He was honored by the Government of India, in 2002, with the fourth highest Indian civilian award of Padma Shri.
He was elected in 2017 to the Ophthalmology Hall of Fame instituted by the American Society of Cataract and Refractive Surgery.

Personal life
At the age of three he was sent to his maternal uncle living in Edupagallu village near to Vijayawada. He studied there until his class 8 at a Telugu school. Following his father, who lived in Chennai near famous ophthalmologist Govindappa Venkataswamy (the founder of Aravind Eye Hospital) Rao decided to become an Ophthalmologist.

Education and career
After completing his basic medical education in Guntur, Andhra Pradesh, Rao completed his postgraduate residency training in ophthalmology at the All India Institute of Medical Sciences, New Delhi. He has received the degree of Doctor of Science (Honoris Causa) from the University of Melbourne, the Honor Award of the American Academy of Ophthalmology, International Blindness Prevention Award from the American Academy of Ophthalmology and the AEBA Award from the Association of Eye Bank of Asia. Rao has served the International Agency for the Prevention of Blindness as a board member, the secretary general (1998) and the president (2004) on various occasions. Apart from training abroad, he is also serving as visiting professor at several universities in the United States, Europe, Australia and Asia. As of 2020, Rao has published more than 300 papers in peer reviewed national and international journals and has served on the editorial boards of several journals. He has five honorary doctorates from Australia, United Kingdom and India.

Awards and honors
 2012: Padma Shree
 2017: Included in the Ophthalmology Hall of Fame at the meeting of American Society of Cataract and Refractive Surgery (ASCRS), Los Angeles.
 Vision Excellence Award- The International Agency for the Prevention of Blindness (IAPB)
 World Cornea Congress Medal from International Cornea Society for outstanding contribution to the field of cornea
 Invited Editorial for the 100th year issue of British Journal of Ophthalmology
 He was honored with the institution of ‘Gullapalli N Rao – AIOS Endowment Lecture’ by the All India Ophthalmological Society
 1983: Honor Award of American Academy of Ophthalmology
 1996: Fellowship of the National Academy of Medical Sciences, India
 2006: International Blindness Prevention Award, by the Board of Trustees of the American Academy of Ophthalmology

References

External links

 Picture of Gullapalli Nageswara Rao

Living people
20th-century Indian medical doctors
Indian ophthalmologists
University of Melbourne alumni
University of Rochester faculty
Medical doctors from Andhra Pradesh
People from Krishna district
Recipients of the Padma Shri in medicine
Fellows of the National Academy of Medical Sciences
Year of birth missing (living people)
20th-century surgeons